Topal may refer to:

 Topal (surname), a surname of Turkish origin
 Topal, Astrakhan Oblast, Russia
 Topal, a Turkish Cypriot folk dance

See also 
 Topol (disambiguation)
 Topal Osman